Stanisław Józef Łyżwiński (born 6 May 1954 in Skaryszew) is a Polish former politician. He was elected to Sejm on 25 September 2005, getting 21,101 votes in 10 Piotrków Trybunalski district as a candidate from Samoobrona Rzeczpospolitej Polskiej list.

He was also a Member of Sejm from 2001 to 2005.

Following a "sex affair" (pl) Łyżwiński was convicted for rape and sentenced to five years in prison.

See also
Members of Polish Sejm 2005 to 2007

References

External links
Stanisław Łyżwiński - parliamentary page - includes declarations of interest, voting record, and transcripts of speeches.

1954 births
Living people
People from Radom County
Members of the Polish Sejm 2005–2007
Members of the Polish Sejm 2001–2005
Self-Defence of the Republic of Poland politicians
Self-Defence of the Republic of Poland MEPs
MEPs for Poland 2004
Polish politicians convicted of crimes